Keith Barefield is a former American football coach. He served as the head coach at Evangel University in Springfield, Missouri from 1989 to 1998, Northwestern Oklahoma State University in Alva, Oklahoma from 2007 to 2011, and Southeastern University in Lakeland, Florida from 2014 to 2019, compiling a record of career college football coaching record of 144–66–2.

Head coaching record

References

Year of birth missing (living people)
Living people
American football fullbacks
Edmonton Elks personnel
Evangel Crusaders football coaches
Evangel Crusaders football players
Northwestern Oklahoma State Rangers football coaches
Southeastern Fire football coaches